Pakistan Army Act, 1952 is the primary statute governing the affairs of Pakistan Army. It was passed by the Parliament of Pakistan in 1952.

Amendments
The act was amended in 2015 under the Pakistan Army (Amendment) Act, 2015. The bill was approved by National Assembly of Pakistan on 6 January 2015. This amendment allowed the establishment of special military courts to try the civilians suspected of terrorism. The courts established under this amendment had a moratorium of two years thus setting an end date of January 2017. Furthermore, Pakistan Army Act, 1952 (PAA) was added to the First Schedule of the Constitution through Twenty-first Amendment to the Constitution of Pakistan making it exempt from voidance under the premise of being against fundamental rights. The establishment of military courts under this amendment was challenged in the Supreme Court of Pakistan but a full court bench of seventeen judges upheld the amendment by an 11 to 6 decision.

Notable trials
On 10 April 2017, Indian spy Kulbhushan Jadhav was sentenced to death by Field General Court Martial under section 59 of the act.

See also
Pakistan Air Force Act, 1953
Pakistan Navy Ordinance, 1961

References

Bibliography
 

Pakistan Army
Acts of the Parliament of Pakistan